This is a comprehensive listing of notable characters from the video game Xenogears, a role-playing video game originally released in 1998 by Square Enix for the PlayStation video game console. Kunihiko Tanaka was the lead character designer, while Tetsuya Takahashi and Masato Kato were the lead writers for the game. Xenogears was a commercial and critical success. The readers of Japanese gaming magazine Famitsu voted  Xenogears the 16th best video game of all time in a 2006 poll.

Xenogears follows the character Fei and his friends as they learn about Deus, a powerful, self-aware interplanetary invasion system that crashed onto the planet ten thousand years before the game's story begins. Deus has been secretly controlling the gradually increasing population of the planet to one day bring about its own resurrection. Fei and Elly, the main protagonists, have been reincarnated throughout history in order to ensure that Deus never achieves its goal. Opposed to Fei and Elly, Miang, the embodiment of Deus and the main antagonist, has reincarnated several times to manipulate the progress of mankind.

Creation and development
The characters of Xenogears were designed to allude to many psychological concepts, notably of Freudian and Jungian psychology. An important character bears the name of French psychoanalyst Jacques Lacan, but the most obvious allusion involves the protagonist, Fei Fong Wong, whose Freudian id, ego and super-ego are discussed at length throughout the course of the game. Fei had subconsciously repressed his memories because of his torturous childhood, but his desire to remember his past eventually leads him to discover the truth about his identity and his relationship with the character Id. This repression also relates to the Jungian concept of the shadow. Distinctly Adlerian in nature, however, are the actions of certain characters, such as Ramsus, whose actions are driven by an inferiority complex that stems from unconscious 'nodes' that often permeate exterior behaviors of an individual. Although not distinctly psychological, allusions to the theories of Friedrich Nietzsche are also found in the game. For example, there is the concept of the eternal return, which, in Xenogears, correlates to the recurrences of the Contact and the Antitype.

Main protagonists

Fei Fong Wong

 is the game's protagonist, whose name alludes to the legendary Wong Fei Hung and is exactly the same as Hung when written in katakana. When the game opens, Fei has lived in the village of Lahan for three years and has no memory of events prior to his arrival. It is soon learned that Fei has a tendency to lose control of himself when he feels fear or anger. When Lahan is attacked, he steps into the cockpit of an abandoned giant fighting robot with the intent of protecting the town, but becomes responsible for laying it to waste. Afterwards, Fei joins with Citan Uzuki and other allies to uncover the web of deception and manipulation surrounding Solaris, and ultimately, Deus. A strong fighter, Fei fights with his bare fists in battle, and his special techniques are known as "Chi".

Fei experiences frequent periods of memory loss and unknowingly has a split personality Id, the product of Fei's pain and anguish at a critically young age. This pain split his mind into three personas: the monster Id, the childlike "coward", and the artificial persona Fei, designed to shield Id from reality. These personas were designed to map to the Freudian ideas of the id, ego and super-ego.

Fei's first incarnation Abel grew up along with the original Elehaym ten thousand years prior to the game's story. They were both killed in a rebellion against the world's ruler, Cain. The second Contact, appeared in the Zeboim era, four thousand years before the game's start. He was Emeralda's creator, although Miang destroyed his technology and he went into hiding afterwards. During the Solaris War five hundred years prior to the game, the Contact appeared as the painter . Joining the rebellion against Solaris, he met Krelian and Sophia, the corresponding incarnation of Elehaym. When Sophia was killed during battle, Lacan decided to destroy the world, turning into Grahf and freeing the Contact to be reincarnated again later as Fei.

The character of Fei has been called "a mystery for the player to follow and solve on their own" by IGN. Edge said of Fei that he "in some ways, conforms to the classic stereotypical lead character, but we quickly discover he’s anything but a blank canvas. Within an hour of play Fei has leveled his home village in an act of brutal destruction, killing his best friends – who you were busily helping prepare for their wedding the next day."

The world of Xenogears was originally designed as more "pastoral" than the final result, and Lahan was planned to have a "martial arts" feel. As the game's script was written this was changed, but the design of Fei, meant to fit in with the original conception, was not able to be revised in the time allotted and remained wearing a martial arts uniform. This led to director Tetsuya Takahashi feeling that his character design was out of place, especially in the latter half of the game. The version of Fei in Zeboim, Kim, was designed with a lab coat and modern Japanese clothing to demonstrate that Zeboim society was similar to modern society. Lacan was intended to have a different design than Fei, but due to time constraints was instead left with the same artwork, and was justified with the idea that Lacan's memories were shared with Fei, who projected his own self-image into them.

Elly Van Houten

, nicknamed , is a young skilled officer of Gebler who meets Fei in the forest near Lahan Village. Elly was leading an operation to steal a top-secret experiment gear from Kislev, but was forced to crash-land in Lahan and was partially responsible for the destruction of the village. Her encounter with Fei changes her life forever. Elly is an optimist, and wants to help Fei, despite the fact that he is a land dweller and that she cannot leave the military. She is a competent fighter with her rods and has elemental ether attacks. Known as the -Antitype-, she has been reincarnated numerous times throughout history along with Fei, her previous incarnation being , the Holy Mother of Nisan.

Citan Uzuki

 is a medical doctor who lives up the mountain path from Lahan with his wife  (granddaughter of the Shevat Guru Gaspar), and his daughter . Citan is a Solaris Guardian Angel, and is working under instructions from the Solaris Emperor to observe Fei to see if he will bring relief or destruction to the world. A very smart individual, Citan is responsible for the development of many of the Gears seen in the game. He has a history with multiple individuals, including Ramsus, Sigurd and Jessie. Citan initially fights with his bare fists but acquires a sword later in the game. During his combos, he moves so fast he has afterimages trailing his movement. When using his sword, Citan always draws and strikes with it in a single motion. Citan's special techniques are known as "Arcane" magic.

Bart Fatima

, nicknamed , is the leader of a group of sand pirates who ride the submarine Yggdrasil. He befriends Fei and Citan after shooting down a prison ship that they were on. Bart is the rightful heir to the kingdom of Aveh, his family having been forced out of the country by Ethos agent Shakhan years before. Bart is constantly accompanied by his mentor and half-brother, as well as the well-mannered . He uses a whip in battle. Bart and Sigurd are each missing an eye (Bart's left and Sigurd's right) and wear identical eyepatches.

Their names are a reference to Edgar Roni Figaro and Sabin Rene Figaro, characters from Final Fantasy VI who were created by Xenogears co-writer Kaori Tanaka.

Rico Banderas

, nicknamed , is a massive demi-human and champion Gear fighter in Nortune, the imperial capital of Kislev. He has a sturdy reputation, and his size can be frightening. Despite being a prisoner, his lifestyle is superior to that of many nobles and he appears to have a connection with the Kislev ruler. Rico is one of the game's strongest physical characters, but also the slowest and with one of the lower accuracy ratings.

Billy Lee Black

 is introduced as a young, pacifistic priest of the Ethos religion, and later is revealed as a member of the Etone branch, which job is to "clean" and "purge" the world from the Reapers, or -Wels-. He has a problematic relationship with his father , who abandoned his family for a number of years after they moved to the surface from Solaris. Having been mentored by the Ethos leader Bishop Stone, Billy dedicated his life to religion and cares for many children including his younger sister  at an Ethos orphanage. Billy's sports a trio of guns in battle and also wields a number of useful support "Ether" spells.

Maria Balthasar
 is a young girl residing in Shevat who pilots Seibzehn, a special Gear her father, Nikolai, created to protect her home. Her father was kidnapped by Solaris to make new Gears, thus giving Maria a large grudge against Solaris. Maria's grandfather is the gear engineer Balthasar. Although her gear is powerful, Maria's physical attacks are weak. However, she can use ether attacks to call Seibzehn to attack enemies, even in enclosed areas.

Chu-Chu

Once mistaken by Bart as a stuffed animal,  was with Marguerite during the teenage girl's imprisonment in Fatima Castle. Her race once lived in the woods, but due to Solaris's activities, they became almost extinct. Some managed to escape to Shevat and live with Wiseman. Chu-Chu can grow to the size of a gear once the physical part of the limiter is removed. She has the unique ability to heal other gears, and doesn't need any fuel to fight, but has poor stats and no special attacks in "gear" form. She has romantic interest for Fei but none of the characters notice and it spooks Fei at first.

Emeralda Kharim

 is a nanomachine colony built to aid the human race. Kim Kharim (Fei's second known incarnation) created Emeralda during the Zeboim era by analyzing Elly's gene pattern, and creating a nanomachine colony. At the time, Miang was manipulating the government, and wanted to reset the human evolutionary cycle by starting a worldwide nuclear war. In the present, Emeralda is revived from an archeological site and is used by Krelian to enhance his nanomachine technology. She is used to guard a Solaris gate, but joins the party afterwards. At first, she seems unable to differentiate between Fei and his previous incarnation Kim, and responds to being told his name is Fei by calling him "Fei's Kim" for most of the remainder of the game. Emeralda's nanomachine-created body makes her a powerful ally in battle, and she possesses powerful ether spells as well. She does not use any weapons, but rather, she morphs her limbs (and hair) into various melee weapons while attacking. Emeralda initially has the appearance of a child, but an optional side quest late in the game causes her to assume the form of an adult woman. This transformation improves her stat growth tremendously.

Main antagonists

Deus
 is the core of an interplanetary invasion system, built ten thousand years prior to the game's story. Because of its power, Deus was placed on the Eldridge spaceship, but it soon became fully self aware and took control of the entire ship. When the captain of the Eldridge self-destructed his ship, Deus was not destroyed, crashing into a nearby planet. Deus then created The Complement named Hawwa (Miang), she gives birth to Emperor Cain and the Gazel Ministry. Hawwa's task was to establish a human civilization on the planet in order to one day use the humans for its resurrection.

Because of the nature of Deus, much of the game's controversy stems from Fei's goal of killing the god that created mankind. This plot was the main reason as to why there were questions of a North American release of the game.

Gazel Ministry
The  exists as the main governing body of Solaris. They were originally among the first human beings born on the planet. They were originally half of the core organic component of Deus, known as the 'Animus', and seek to realign with their respective 'Anima' (the Anima Relics).

Five hundred years before the events of the game, the Ministry were at odds with Miang, so they provided her to Shevat in exchange for the rebel army. Soon after this, they were killed by the mysterious Diabolos forces summoned by Grahf. Krelian eventually revived eight of the twelve ministers as computer data in the SOL-9000 after becoming part of Solaris.

Throughout the game the Ministry is fearful of Fei and seek to destroy him because Fei is the reincarnation of Lacan, who was responsible for their original demise. They show utter disdain towards Ramsus because of his constant failure to defeat Fei and call him 'Trash'. At the same time, they seek to resurrect their bodies using the main characters, who are their descendants. The Ministry eventually becomes at odds with Emperor Cain when he prevents them from using the 'Gaetia Key', a device that will resurrect God's paradise, Mahanon. Because of Miang and Krelian's manipulation of Ramsus, he assassinates Cain for them and the Ministry goes ahead and uses the Key. However, once the key has been used, Krelian has no more use for them and has them promptly deleted, wiping them out permanently.

Grahf
Calling himself "The Seeker of Power",  is the persona of Lacan that split off after Lacan made contact with the Zohar five hundred years prior to the start of Xenogears influenced by Miang. Grahf is the personification of Lacan's will but is not considered to be the "original" Lacan (i.e. the "Contact"). The Contact, instead, transmigrated to be reborn in the body of Fei Fong Wong.

Grahf's goal is to merge with Fei and thus reclaim his original form as "The Contact" then to awaken the weapon Deus and destroy all life. He came to the conclusion that this was the only path to freedom after his contact with the Existence as Lacan. Grahf learned the ability to pass on from body to body, thus granting him a form of eternal life.

Grahf discovers the new incarnation of the Contact in Fei when Fei is still a child and attempts to meld with him. However, Fei's father, Khan, attempts to stop him. During their battle, Fei was unable to contain the powers passed onto him by the Existence and released a force so powerful that Fei's mother was killed. Grahf then took Fei who had awakened as Id. Id then trained under Grahf as an assassin, until Khan caught up to them. Grahf then tried to merge with Id(Fei) but Khan fought back and in the end defeated Grahf, Grahf then took over Khan's body, but not before Khan (as Wiseman) was able to take Fei to Lahan Village before the beginning of the game.

Although he no longer possesses the full potential of "The Contact," Grahf has immense strength and powers. He is more powerful than any other character except for Fei as "The Contact" (when all divisions of his personality merge). He can easily destroy gears with his bare hands and effortlessly defeats multiple omnigears (include Fei's Weltall 2 with System-Id) during the battle at Mahanon. However, he rarely fights directly, and instead on several occasions granted what he called "the Power" to defeated lesser villains, allowing them to challenge Fei and his friends with enhanced abilities. This power invariably leads to madness, and their resulting destruction.

Grahf is finally defeated by Fei after the latter merges with all of his personalities and meets the Wave Existence. Now able to access his full powers, Fei's gear transforms into the Xenogears and engages Grahf in a one-on-one fight. Grahf is beaten and subsequently sacrifices himself to merge with the Zohar and delay the awakening of Deus, allowing Fei and party to escape and prepare for the final battle.

Id
 is Fei's split personality, created when Fei tried to repress his childhood memories about being abused by scientists and his mother, who was possessed by Miang. Throughout the game, Id appears when Fei is off screen. Fei is also unaware of Id until it is explained to him late in the game. Id represents Fei's id, adding a Freudian aspect to his character. Id is an often brutal and malicious character, violently seeking to destroy the planet by making contact with the Zohar.

Kahran Ramsus
 commands Gebler alongside Miang and holds a prominent position in the hierarchy in Solaris. He was originally created in a nanoreactor by Miang and Krelian as a clone of the Emperor Cain, but was thrown away once Fei was discovered. He grew up in the Elements, a special Solaris fighting squad, and knew Citan, who was attracted to Ramsus' ideals against class distinctions. Ramsus grows obsessed with defeating Fei over the course of the game because it was Fei's existence that made Ramsus feel worthless.

Krelian

 is the secondary antagonist and the anti-hero of the game. He is the leader of Solaris, the antagonistic nation that controls the affairs of much of the world. Initially a land dweller, Krelian's scientific knowledge has enabled him to prolong his life and exert power over the Solaris' Emperor Cain and the main governing body, the Gazel Ministry. After the death of his beloved Sophia centuries ago, Krelian became convinced that God did not exist and that he would need to create God with his own hands and starts working with Miang. The name Krelian is a mistransliteration from Japanese for "Karellen", referencing an overlord character from Arthur C. Clarke's novel Childhood's End. He is the villain with more development in the game, playing a crucial role in the Solaris war and after.

Miang
 is the main antagonist and the mastermind behind all the events in the Xenogears' timeline. She appears repeatedly throughout the game's events in opposition to the party, both behind the scenes and in direct confrontations, Miang acts as representative of Deus, an intergalactic bioweapon designed to conduct warfare on a planetary scale. The final moments of the Eldridge catastrophe resulted in the creation of the original 'mother' being, tasked by the Deus system to give birth to an entire civilization that would provide and gather all the biological and mechanical "spare parts" it needed to repair and reactivate. Hawwa is the Arabic name of Eve. Myyah (the official romanization according to Perfect Works) is almost the reverse of Elly's full name (Elhaym), with the omitted 'El' being Hebrew and meaning 'God', symbolizing how she is connected to but different from that character.

One of the few humans that Deus gave birth to, Miang's first incarnation was known as Hawwa, The Complement. Hawwa's purpose was to guide and shape the events of human history to better suit the coming resurrection of Deus. All human women descended from the crash of the Eldridge, all inhabiting the planet the game takes place on, possess the genetic factor necessary to become the next incarnation of Miang. When the current one dies, Miang simply awakens in a new body. The target seems to be randomly selected, but she always inhabits the body of an adult female, and the momentary transformation always results in purple hair and eye color. The only notable superhuman abilities she possesses are the ability to retain memory across incarnations and some considerable psionic abilities, strong enough to cleanly "reprogram" someone's subconscious to perform a chosen task, though for the most part she prefers working in the shadows to manipulate world events. This is evidenced by her sparse participation in battles in a mostly supportive role, usually piloting her C-1 Vierge.

TIMELINE OF KNOWN AWAKENINGS

Eldridge catastrophe - 10,000 years prior to game

Deus activated biological computer Kadomony, generating the first mother being in response to Abel's contact with the Wave Existence shortly before planetfall. This original being emerges from the wreckage and gives birth to Miang, Elly, Cain and the Gazel Ministry, then returned to Kadomony's stasis pod where she slowly rots over the next several thousand years. Miang begins her mission to supplement Deus' plans.

Zeboim era - 4,000 years prior to game

Miang awakens in a pair of identical twin sisters, using their connection to her advantage to conduct espionage within the Zeboim government. Upon finding out that a nano-engineer named Kim is working on a way to repair the genetic breakdown causing infertility in the vast majority of Zeboim citizens, she commissions Kim to continue his work. However, when he moves to secure his creation for himself she sends an assault team to requisition it and kill anyone in their way. She influences events to accelerate the death of the civilization so that humanity can 'reset' to a form more desirable for Deus, resulting in nuclear annihilation of the entire Zeboim civilization, which then sinks to the bottom of the Aquvy sea.

The beginning of the end - approx. 20–12 years prior to game

Unable to locate the current incarnation of the -Contact-, Miang cooperates with Krelian to clone an artificial -Contact- using Emperor Cain's DNA. The clone, which would later become Kahran Ramsus, gains awareness before even being born and develops an inferiority complex soon thereafter. Miang dies of old age, and awakens in Karen Wong, Fei Fong Wong's mother, and uses her new position to conduct battery after battery of torturous experiments on Fei while his father is away, resulting in the inadvertent creation of Id. Miang stands by passively while Grahf attacks Khan Wong, triggering a spontaneous release of Fei's power. Karen regains control momentarily, long enough to throw herself in front of her son to save his life, and is mortally wounded in the process. Fei recedes into the "coward" personality, shielding himself by displacing the tragedy and horror of these events onto his alter-ego, Id, who remains the dominant personality for the rest of his teenage years under Grahf's destructive tutelage. Miang reawakens in a new host body, apparently in her early twenties, and begins to court Kahran Ramsus in order to gain power within the Gebler faction on Solaris.

Final Chapter

Miang is cut down by Ramsus in front of the newly activated Deus. The party witnesses her reawakening in Elly, who explains humanity's purpose relative to Deus shortly before being absorbed into its core. Deus utilizes its newly acquired Anima Relics and Krelian's nanotechnology to ascend to a higher, more advanced form than its original design was capable of, and climbs into orbit in an attempt to resume its journey. Fei gives pursuit in the Xenogears, the only Gear left operational after the destruction of the Zohar Modifier, and battles with Miang in her final incarnation, that of the Urobolus. After Fei had successfully defeated her in this form, she had then ceased to exist. Once Miang is eradicated for good, Krelian is convinced of Fei's point of view and resigns from his original mission, opting instead to walk the Path of Sephirot and travel to the higher dimension from which the Wave Existence originated, leaving Fei and Elly to return to the planet in the Xenogears. The chains of fate are broken, and Fei and Elly become the final incarnations of their eternally returning personas, with the memories and experiences of all their past selves incorporated into them.

Other characters

Emperor Cain
 is the ruler of Solaris. Created along with the Gazel Ministry and Miang, his role was to also serve in the resurrection of Deus. When Abel and Elly fight against Cain's plans for resurrecting Deus, it was Cain that plotted the death of Abel, an allusion to Original sin. Although he is supposed to aid Deus, as a leader of Solaris, Cain actually believes in making the lives of the humans better. He becomes at odds with the Gazel Ministry when they want to use the Gaetia Key and is eventually assassinated by Ramsus under Krelian's orders.

Margie Fatima
, nicknamed , is the current Holy Mother of Nisan, the position once held by Sophia. She is both Bart's first cousin and his fiancée, as they are both the only living members of the Fatima royal family. She has a calm, endearing nature, despite her duties.

Hammer
 is a rat demi-human who meets Fei in Kislev's D Block Prison. During the Kislev scenario, Hammer presents himself as a shifty, though somewhat reliable mechanic, item seller, and intelligence gatherer. Hammer seems to be well known throughout Kislev, as he is able to freely roam on his own accord, despite being a prisoner. Hammer tags along with the group as they steal the Goliath plane, but is separated from them following an encounter with Grahf. Much later on in the story, Hammer resurfaces after apparently encountering Krelian at some point and being given a new cyborg body. He explains to the party that he had originally been sent to spy on them, but in the end he had refused to cooperate. He then asks the party to destroy him as he has only a limited amount of control over his new body and he doesn't want to continue being Krelian's puppet. He then proceeds to sabotage his own gear while the party takes him down.

The Elements
The elite of the elite among Solaris' military, a four-member team with each representing one of four elements (earth, water, wind, fire). In the past, the group was Ramsus, Citan, Jesse and Sigurd, major and minor players in the game, however, in the present, it is composed of four young women, each named after an order of angels. They currently work directly under Ramsus, and encounter the party several times in the adventure.  , the Element of Earth, leads the team and is the only member with a surname. She is a vicious, domineering woman. Dominia was molded into the soldier she is after becoming the sole survivor of the events at Elru, a country destroyed by war, and Id in particular. She has numerous altercations with Elly in particular, mocking her for her noble origins. While being the Element of Earth, Dominia actually infuses any of the four elements into her blade, she is the only Element to do this, as the others exclusively use their own element. Dominia pilots a sword-wielding gear called Bladegash.  Kelvena is the Element of Water, and the opposite of Domina, she is calm and cool. Kelvena once even apologizes to Elly for Dominia's harshness, despite being on opposing sides. Kelvena pilots an aquatic gear called Marinebasher. In-game dialogue pictures of Kelvena often show her with her eyes closed, implying she may have been blind, but in reality, Kelvena's innate ether power is so great, she must exert a considerable amount of concentration to keep it under control.  Tolone is the Element of Wind. She is the only one who is a cyborg, as she makes a reference to her "positronic photon brain", and typically serious and humorless. Tolone pilots a bird-like gear called Skyghene.   is the Element of Fire, and a foil to Dominia and Tolone's rigidity, as she acts like a complete bimbo. She pilots a gear called Grandgrowl, which resembles a lion. In the final encounter vs the Elements, they combine their four gears into a super-gear.

Wave Existence
The Zohar was an energy source for Deus, While attempting to explore infinite energy phenomena, the Zohar tapped into a higher dimension and pulled the Existence to this dimension, becoming a source of infinite energy for Deus. The Existence is the source of the higher dimension, of which a small portion spilled into this dimension, making the Existence the true God of the Xenogears universe. Its only wish is to be free of the 'prison' which holds it, the Zohar, and to return to Its own dimension. The Wave Existence makes contact with Abel, Fei's ancestor, aboard the Eldridge, allowing Abel to safely land on the planet with Deus. The Wave Existence also creates Elly as a companion for Abel and gives them both the power to be reincarnated throughout history in order to defeat Deus. It wants to be free from Deus and when Fei defeats Deus, the Wave Existence is freed.

Wiseman
Often appearing to Fei to help him,  is secretly a personality inside of his father, . Wiseman forms inside of Khan when Grahf enters Khan's body after Khan defeated Grahf ten years prior to the game's start. Wiseman's appearance inside Khan occurred to balance out Grahf's destructive persona. Wiseman brought Fei to Lahan to hide him from Grahf.

Queen Zephyr
 is the ruler of Shevat, after the rest of the royal family was killed five hundred years prior to the start of the game in the rebellion against Solaris. She relies on Wiseman to keep her informed of events outside Shevat.

Reception
The characters of Xenogears have been well received, the lead protagonist Fei in particular, who has been called videogames' "most complicated Freudian hero." The staff of Edge felt that Fei's deep backstory and character in general was "a far cry from the simplistic two-dimensional leads of Square’s Super Nintendo RPGs of just a few years earlier." Edge also pointed out the NPCs present during the beginning scenes and how they bring depth to the scenario. "As a player, you feel awkward and ashamed in the presence of these NPCs, a guilty confusion and helplessness which perfectly mirrors that felt by your character and justifies his immediate exile", the staff wrote. IGN praised both the characters themselves and their designs. In a review for the game at Pulpfilm.com, attention is paid to the secondary characters, who, as the reviewer explains, have "profoundly interesting backstories", but are never adequately resolved by the end of the game, which other reviews also note. An article from Electronic Gaming Monthly titled WTFiction!? listed Xenogears as one of the "wackiest game plotlines ever." Jeremey Parish went on to write that many characters in the game only made the plot more confusing, including Chu-Chu and Grahf.

The in-game character sprites have met less praise. A GameSpot reviewer stated that the "game's character sprites are poorly animated and suffer from terrible pixelation, no doubt due to the PlayStation's limited RAM." Other critics disagree, arguing that the characters are more realistic than the characters from Final Fantasy VII. In a preview of the game, IGN compared the character sprites to those of Parasite Eve, saying that "the game's designers have opted for a more traditional, anime-style look. But this doesn't mean the pint-size characters or low-detail environments of RPGs gone by."

Notes

References

External links
Characters of Xenogears Official North American Website

Xenogears
Xenogears